The Light in the Hall is a drama filmed in both Welsh and English.

Production 
The series was co-produced by S4C, Channel 4, and the producers Duchess Street Productions and Triongl in association with APC Studios. The show is based in Carmarthenshire, Wales where two of the leading actors, Alexandra Roach and Iwan Rheon are from. Significant parts of the series were also filmed in the Tywi Valley, in the towns of Llandovery, Llangadog, Llandeilo and Carmarthen. Some filming was also done in Cardiff.

Plot

The Welsh series has six episodes and is based in Llanemelyn, a town in west Wales. It follows a young journalist, Cat Donato who is played by Alexandra Roach who's best friend Ela Roberts, went missing 18 years ago. A quiet gardener named Joe Pritchard played by Iwan Rheon, is arrested following a confession but he cannot explain what happened to the body.

Release and reception 

The series was made in 2022 and screened in the UK on Channel 4 in January 2023.

Rotten Tomatoes ratings were 71% critics and 75% audience.

One review says that the series takes an hour to set the scene and is at it's strongest during the interpersonal scenes, particularly the tender relationship between Sharon and Dai. Greta’s refusal to join her mother’s “Murderwang! Gang” is a memorable moment also.

Cast 
Sharon - Joanna Scanlan

Joe - Iwan Rheon

Cat - Alexandra Roach

Dai - Morgan Hopkins

Murat Ozdemir - Memet Ali Alibora

Judge Rowe - Anita Reynolds

Young Joe - Dylan Jones

Ela - Ella Peel

Ceri-Ann - Shelley Rees

Bronwen - Andria Doherty

Maddie - Llinor ap Gwynedd

Steve - Ben Bailey Smith

Mags - Siwan Morris

Greta - Annes Elwy

DCI Parry - Ioan Hefin

Sali - Catherine Ayres

Rhydian - Gareth Elis

Sasha - Lily Beau Conway

Young Shelley - Mari Ann Bull

Phil - Alex Harries

Eilis - Delyth Wyn

Ian - Aled Pugh

References 

Television shows set in Wales

Welsh television series
S4C original programming
Channel 4 miniseries